The 2018 season is Club de Regatas Vasco da Gama's 120th complete calendar year in existence, the club's 103rd season in existence of football, and the club's 45th season playing in the Brasileirão Série A, the top flight of Brazilian football.

Players

Squad information 
As of 9 March 2018.

from Vasco da Gama (B) (reserve team) 
As of 18 December 2017.

from Vasco da Gama (U–20) (ables to play in first team)

Out on loan

Transfers

In

Loan in

from Youth system

On trial (in)

Out

Loan out

to Youth system

On trial (out)

Competitions 
Times from 1 January to 17 February 2018 and from 4 November to 31 December 2018 are UTC–2, from 17 February 2018 to 3 November 2018 UTC–3.

Overview

Brasileirão Série A

League table

Results summary

Result round by round

Matches

Copa do Brasil 

Vasco da Gama joined the competition in the round of 16.

Copa Libertadores 

Vasco da Gama joined the competition in the second qualifying stage.

Copa Libertadores squad 

Notes

Qualifying stages

Group stage

Copa Sudamericana 

Vasco da Gama joined the competition in the second qualifying stage.

Campeonato do Estado do Rio de Janeiro

Taça Guanabara

Group stage

Taça Rio de Janeiro

Group stage

Knockout phase

Championship phase

Statistics

Squad appearances and goals 
Last updated on 8 April 2018.

|-
! colspan=16 style=background:#dcdcdc; text-align:center|Goalkeepers

|-
! colspan=16 style=background:#dcdcdc; text-align:center|Defenders

|-
! colspan=16 style=background:#dcdcdc; text-align:center|Midfielders

|-
! colspan=16 style=background:#dcdcdc; text-align:center|Forwards

|-
! colspan=16 style=background:#dcdcdc; text-align:center| Players of second squads who have made an appearance or had a squad number this season 

|-
! colspan=16 style=background:#dcdcdc; text-align:center| Players of youth squads who have made an appearance or had a squad number this season 

|-
! colspan=16 style=background:#dcdcdc; text-align:center| Players who have made an appearance or had a squad number this season but have transferred or loaned out during the season

|}

Notes

Goals 

1 Includes Rio de Janeiro State Championship and friendlies.

Clean sheets 

1 Includes Rio de Janeiro State Championship and friendlies.

Disciplinary record 

1 Includes Rio de Janeiro State Championship and friendlies.

References

External links 

CR Vasco da Gama
Club de Regatas Vasco da Gama seasons
Vasco da Gama